George Everett Adams (June 18, 1840 – October 5, 1917) was a U.S. Representative from Illinois.

Early years 
Adams was born in Keene, New Hampshire, on June 18, 1840, son of Benjamin F. Adams and Louisa Redington, grandson of Benjamin Adams, and a descendant of William Adams of Ipswich, Massachusetts.

Adams moved with his parents to Chicago, Illinois, in 1853. He attended Phillips Exeter Academy, Exeter, New Hampshire, and Harvard University. He was graduated from Harvard an A.B. in 1860 and an LL.B., 1865. During the Civil War, he served in the First Illinois Artillery. After his war service, he attended Harvard Law School, was admitted to the bar in 1865 in Chicago and commenced practice of his profession in 1867.

Career 
He served as a member of the Illinois State Senate from 1881 until March 3, 1883, when he resigned to enter Congress.

Adams was elected as a Republican to the Forty-eighth Congress and to the three succeeding Congresses from March 4, 1883, to March 3, 1891 (49th, 50th and 51st congresses). He was an unsuccessful candidate for reelection in 1890 to the Fifty-second Congress.
He was one of the founders of the Chicago Symphony Orchestra, being instrumental with a few others in securing the land in downtown Chicago where the orchestra is today. />

Last years 
On retiring from public life Adams continued the practice of law in Chicago until his death. He died at his summer home in Peterborough, New Hampshire, on October 5, 1917, and he was interred in Pine Hill Cemetery at Dover, New Hampshire.

References

Sources

External links 
 
 

1840 births
1917 deaths
People from Keene, New Hampshire
Illinois lawyers
Union Army soldiers
Phillips Exeter Academy alumni
Harvard Law School alumni
Republican Party members of the United States House of Representatives from Illinois
Republican Party Illinois state senators
19th-century American politicians
19th-century American lawyers